Charles Alexander Price (April 8, 1882 – February 7, 1955) was a Canadian professional ice hockey player. He played with the Montreal Wanderers of the National Hockey Association.

References

1882 births
1955 deaths
Canadian ice hockey defencemen
Montreal Wanderers (NHA) players
Ice hockey people from Montreal